Dead in a Week or Your Money Back (stylized as Dead in a Week (Or Your Money Back) is a 2018 British black comedy film, the directorial debut of Tom Edmunds. The plot follows Leslie (Tom Wilkinson), who is an aging hitman on the brink of retirement, and who has not met his annual quota with the British Guild of Assassins. His officious boss Harvey (Christopher Eccleston) sets him a deadline that forces Leslie to resort to desperate measures – hanging out at suicide hotspots to try and pick up some extra business. On the wrong side of Chelsea Bridge, he meets struggling writer William (Aneurin Barnard). Leslie offers an unconventional deal – Dead In A Week (or your money back). But with the deal signed, William finally finds some sense of security, leading him to wonder if the deal is what he really wanted.

The film premiered at the 2018 Edinburgh International Film Festival and also screened at the Rome International Film Festival, ahead of an exclusive release in Odeon Cinemas UK, by Republic Film Distribution.

Reception
The film was well supported on its release in UK Cinemas, backed by Stephen Fry who became an Executive Producer  and The Samaritans. 
The critical reception was mixed. The Hollywood Reporter praised Tom Wilkinson's depiction of the hitman "Although Leslie proves quite ruthless and skilled at his evil profession, the veteran actor manages to make him somehow lovable."
Perhaps surprisingly the film had a much wider theatrical release in Italy taking almost $700k at the box office
The film was also released by Netflix in 2019.

Cast
 Tom Wilkinson as Leslie
 Aneurin Barnard as William
 Freya Mavor as Ellie
 Christopher Eccleston as Harvey 
 Marion Bailey as Penny
 Velibor Topic as Ivan
 Nigel Lindsay as Brian

References

External links
 
 

2018 black comedy films
2018 films
British black comedy films
Films set in England
2010s English-language films
2010s British films